Laurence Alfred Mound (born 1934 in Willesden, London) is an entomologist, who works mostly on the biology and systematics of Thysanoptera (thrips), an area in which he is considered a world authority.

His zoological author abbreviation is Mound.

Career 
He gained a B.Sc in zoology at the University of London in 1957, a diploma in Economic Entomology in 1958 from Imperial College, London,  a diploma of Tropical Agriculture from I.C.T.A. Trinidad in 1959, and in 1975 was awarded a D.Sc from the University of London.

From 1959-1961 he served in Ibadan as entomologist to the Nigerian Department of Agricultural Research, working on whitefly vectors of crop virus diseases. In Sudan (1961-1964), he continued this work on whiteflies as entomologist to the Empire Cotton Growing Corporation. In 1964 he was appointed to the British Museum of Natural History, where he was responsible for the collections of whitefly and thrips and their research. He became head of the hemiptera section of BMNH in 1969, and deputy keeper of the entomology department in 1975, and head keeper in 1981.   In 1994 he moved to Australia where he continues to work on Thysanoptera.

Taxa authored
He has described over 640 thrips species and some 90 thrips genera.
See :Category:Taxa named by Laurence Alfred Mound and also a List of wikidata taxa authored by Laurence Alfred Mound.

Selected publications

References 

1934 births
Living people
People from Willesden
Entomologists from London
Alumni of the University of London
Alumni of Imperial College London
University of the West Indies alumni